Gary Roy Nairn  (born 3 January 1951) is a former Australian politician.

Nairn was born in Sydney, and was educated at Sydney Boys High School from 1963 to 1968 before attending University of New South Wales. He was a surveyor in private practice and managing director of a surveying and mapping consultancy before entering politics.  He moved to the Northern Territory where he lived for many years. He was President of the Country Liberal Party between 1990 and 1994, during which time the CLP won two elections with an increased vote.

Nairn returned to New South Wales and in March 1996 was elected a Liberal Party of Australia member of the Australian House of Representatives, representing the seat of Eden-Monaro.

In 2003, he headed a federal inquiry into the 2003 Canberra bushfires.  He was appointed Parliamentary Secretary to Prime Minister John Howard in October 2004. In January 2006 he was promoted to the front bench as Special Minister of State which included responsibilities with Ministerial and Parliamentary Services, the Australian Government Information Management Office, Australian Electoral Commission, Defence Housing Authority and Film Australia. He served in Howard's outer ministry.

Nairn's hold on Eden-Monaro was always rather tenuous. For most of the time since the late 1960s, the seat has been highly marginal; it had been held by the party of government without interruption since 1972. Even in the midst of a massive swing to the Coalition in 2004, for instance, Nairn only managed a swing of 0.4 percent.

In September 2007, Nairn's chief of staff, Peter Phelps, engaged in a heated verbal exchange with the Labor Party candidate for Eden-Monaro, Mike Kelly at a forum on the Iraq War in Queanbeyan, New South Wales.  At the meeting Phelps claimed that Mike Kelly was a hypocrite as a former soldier running for the ALP when they are opposed to the war in Iraq. Phelps stated at the meeting that he thought Kelly was using the Nuremberg defence, and compared it to the kind of defence used by guards at the Bergen-Belsen concentration camp. Nairn did not agree with his staffer's sentiments.

In the 2007 federal election, Nairn lost his seat to Labor candidate Mike Kelly. Nairn was one of five members of the Howard ministry to lose their seats at the election.

In 2018 Gary was appointed Chairman of The Duke of Edinburgh's International Award – Australia.

References

 

1951 births
Living people
Liberal Party of Australia members of the Parliament of Australia
Members of the Australian House of Representatives for Eden-Monaro
Members of the Australian House of Representatives
Officers of the Order of Australia
University of New South Wales alumni
21st-century Australian politicians
20th-century Australian politicians